Vyākhyāprajñapti ( "Exposition of Explanations"), commonly known as the Bhagavati Sūtra, is the fifth of the 12 Jain Agamas said to be promulgated by Mahāvīra. The Vyākhyāprajñapti is said to have been composed by Sudharmaswami by the Śvētāmbara school of Jainism; it is written in Jain Prakrit. It is the largest text of the canon, said to contain 36,000 questions answered by Mahavira. The subject matter of the answers ranges from doctrine to rules of ascetic behaviour.

Contents
The Vyākhyāprajñapti is divided into 41 sections known as shatakas. It follows question and answer pattern. The questions are raised by Gautama, Makandiputra, Roha, Agnibhuti and Vayubhuti, Skandaka, Jayanti and others. Briefly, the answers may be categorised under the following categories:
related to ascetic conduct
related to the six substances
related to ontology
related to reincarnation
related to geography
related to cosmology
related to mathematics
related to obstetrics
brief biographies of famous contemporaries of Mahavira
miscellaneous subjects

English translations
Illustrated BHAGAVATI SUTRA Vol. 1, VYAKHYA PRAJNAPTI Prakrit Gatha - Hindi exposition - English exposition; with a glossary Ed. by Pravartaka Amar Muni, Shrichand Surana Saras Eng. tr. by Surendra Bothra

External links
 Bhagavati-sutra (English translation) *first twelve books*, by K. C. Lalwani, 1973, includes commentary by Abhayadeva Suri

Jain texts
Agamas